Richard Henry Wadge (1864–1923) was an English football manager who managed Burnley for a short spell in 1910. Born in Liskeard, Cornwall, he initially joined Burnley as a director before taking charge of the first team for three matches following the death of former manager Spen Whittaker. His first match in charge was the 0–1 defeat to Glossop at Turf Moor on 18 April 1910. Five days later, the team drew 1–1 with Leicester Fosse and his final match in charge was the 3–0 victory at home to Lincoln City on 30 April 1910, which was the final match of the 1909–10 season. He subsequently returned to his role as a director and was replaced as manager by John Haworth prior to the start of the 1910–11 campaign. Wadge died in London in 1923, at the age of 59.

References

English football managers
Burnley F.C. managers
1864 births
1923 deaths
People from Liskeard
English Football League managers